Charleston City Hall is a historic city hall located at Charleston, West Virginia. It was constructed in 1921 in the Neoclassical style. It is located opposite the Kanawha County Courthouse, at the center of downtown
Charleston. The major, or entrance, elevation faces Virginia Street with monumental design features and walls clad in smooth gray limestone. The equally impressive limestone-faced Court Street facade presents a grand prospect which runs southward for nearly a block between Virginia Street and Kanawha Boulevard.  These two elevations are entirely formal in design because they were intended to face the courthouse and principal city thoroughfare. The four-story building is centered with a colossal engaged colonnade of six fluted Doric columns, which rises three-stories in support of a massive cornice.  The interior features a grand entrance lobby, and classically designed stairhall and council chambers.

It was listed on the National Register of Historic Places in 1988.

References

Beaux-Arts architecture in West Virginia
Buildings and structures in Charleston, West Virginia
City halls in West Virginia
Neoclassical architecture in West Virginia
Government buildings completed in 1921
City and town halls on the National Register of Historic Places in West Virginia
H. Rus Warne buildings
National Register of Historic Places in Charleston, West Virginia
Renaissance Revival architecture in West Virginia